Émilie Gomis (born 18 October 1983) is a French-Senegalese professional basketball player currently playing point guard position for French club Hainaut Basket and played for Fenerbahçe of the TWBL league. She wears the number 4.

Competing for France, she won a silver medal at the 2012 Summer Olympics.

References

External links 
 
 
 
 Profile of Émilie Gomis at basketlfb.com 

1983 births
Living people
Basketball players at the 2012 Summer Olympics
Fenerbahçe women's basketball players
French expatriate basketball people in the United States
French sportspeople of Senegalese descent
French women's basketball players
Knights of the Ordre national du Mérite
Medalists at the 2012 Summer Olympics
Olympic basketball players of France
Olympic medalists in basketball
Olympic silver medalists for France
Guards (basketball)